Be is the thirty-first album by the jazz fusion group Casiopea recorded and  released in 1998.

Track listing

Personnel 
CASIOPEA are
Issei Noro - Guitars
Minoru Mukaiya - Keyboards
Yoshihiro Naruse - Bass

Supported
Akira Jimbo - Drums

Additional Musicians
Gen Ohgimi - Percussion (#3,4,7,10,12)
Rie Akagi - Flute (#5)
R.P.M.(David K. Lawson, Wanda D. P. Lawson, Elaine Entzminger, Kenneth F. Stewart) - Chorus (#12)

Production 
 Sound Produced - CASIOPEA

 Recording & Mixing Engineer - Hiroyuki Shimura
 Assistant Engineer - Masashi Yanagisawa, Genta Tamai, Tadashi Yamaguchi
 Mastering Engineer - Mitsuharu Harada

 Instruments Technician - Yasushi Horiuchi, Eisuke Sasaki, Satoshi Tsuchiya

 Art Direction, Design & Photography - Satoshi Yanagisawa
 Styling - Sono Terasawa
 Hair & Make up - Nobuyuki Kougo

Release history

References

External links
 

1998 albums
Casiopea albums
Pony Canyon albums